is a former Japanese football player.

Playing career
Kawaguchi was born in Shibuya, Tokyo on June 18, 1981. He joined the J1 League club Kyoto Purple Sanga from the Yokohama F. Marinos youth team in 2000. On April 15, he debuted as a substitute left side midfielder at the 35th minute against Kawasaki Frontale. His next match was in the J.League Cup tournament on April 19; he played full-time as the left side midfielder against Albirex Niigata. However, he only played in that match in 2000 and the club was relegated to the J2 League in 2001. In 2001, he did not play in any matches. In 2002, he moved to the J2 club Albirex Niigata. However he did not play in any matches there, either. In 2003, he moved to the Japan Football League (JFL) club Otsuka Pharmaceutical. In 2003, he played many matches and the club won the championship. Although the club won the championship two years in a row and was promoted to J2 at the end of the 2005 season, he rarely played. In 2005, he moved to the newly promoted JFL club Mitsubishi Mizushima. He played often as a regular player over five seasons until 2009. However the club was relegated to the Prefectural Leagues at the end of the 2009 season due to financial strain and he retired at that time.

Club statistics

References

External links

kyotosangadc

1981 births
Living people
Association football people from Tokyo
Japanese footballers
J1 League players
J2 League players
Japan Football League players
Kyoto Sanga FC players
Albirex Niigata players
Tokushima Vortis players
Mitsubishi Mizushima FC players
Association football defenders